Guillermo "Guille" Bueno López (born 18 September 2002) is a Spanish professional footballer who plays as a left back for Borussia Dortmund II.

Career
Born in Vigo, Bueno played for CD Areosa's academy before joining Deportivo La Coruña's academy in 2020. After a season with Deportivo La Coruña, he signed for German Bundesliga side Borussia Dortmund in summer 2021 on a three-year contract, initially joining their reserve team. Bueno reportedly turned down an offer of a contract extension from Deportivo but was still under contract until 2022; Deportivo alleged that Bueno's transfer to Dortmund was improper and threatened a lawsuit. He made his debut for the Dortmund's reserve team on 24 October 2021 as a substitute in a 1–0 3. Liga defeat to Viktoria Köln.

Personal life
He is the twin brother of Hugo Bueno, who plays for Premier League club Wolverhampton Wanderers.

References

External links

2002 births
Living people
Spanish footballers
Footballers from Vigo
Association football fullbacks
Deportivo de La Coruña players
Borussia Dortmund II players
3. Liga players
Spanish expatriate footballers
Expatriate footballers in Germany
Spanish expatriate sportspeople in Germany
Twin sportspeople